This was the second season where the FA Cup, or the Football Association Challenge Cup, used a series of qualifying rounds in order to determine qualifiers for the actual Cup competition itself.

See 1889–90 FA Cup for details of the rounds from the first round onwards.

First qualifying round

Second qualifying round

Third qualifying round

Fourth qualifying round

References

Qualifying
FA Cup qualifying rounds